The results of the 2010 Little League World Series were determined between August 20 and August 29, 2010 in South Williamsport, Pennsylvania. 16 teams were divided into four groups, two with four teams from the United States and two with four international teams each, with both groups playing a double-elimination tournament. In each group, the last remaining team advanced to the single-elimination stage. The last remaining team from the United States faced the last remaining international team for the Little League World Series Championship.

Pool Play

Pool A

Game 1: Ohio 16, New Jersey 6

Game 2: Georgia 6, Hawaii 2

Game 3: Hawaii 3, New Jersey 1

Game 4: Georgia 6, Ohio 0

Game 5: Hawaii 6, Ohio 4

Game 6: Hawaii 7, Georgia 4

Game 7: Hawaii 12, Georgia 5

Pool B

Game 1: Connecticut 3, Washington 1

Game 2: Texas 10, Minnesota 8

Game 3: Washington 5, Minnesota 2

Game 4: Texas 14, Connecticut 1

Game 5: Washington 9, Connecticut 5

Game 6: Washington 7, Texas 4

Game 7: Texas 7, Washington 5

Pool C

Game 1: Puerto Rico 11, Germany 0

Game 2: Japan 4, Mexico 2

Game 3: Mexico 11, Germany 2

Game 4: Japan 7, Puerto Rico 2

Game 5: Mexico 4, Puerto Rico 2

Game 6: Japan 3, Mexico 2

Pool D

Game 1: Canada 4, Panama 2

Game 2: Chinese Taipei 18, Saudi Arabia 0

Game 3: Panama 13, Saudi Arabia 0

Game 4: Chinese Taipei 23, Canada 0

Game 5: Panama 4, Canada 2

Game 6: Chinese Taipei 5, Panama 1

Crossover games

Game A: Germany 2, Minnesota 1

Game B: New Jersey 10, Saudi Arabia 0

Elimination round

Semifinals

International championship: Japan 3, Chinese Taipei 2

United States championship: Hawaii 10, Texas 0

Consolation game

World Championship Game

References

External links
Full schedule from littleleague.org

2010 Little League World Series